Persico may refer to:

 Persico (surname), an Italian surname
 Persico Marine, High performance boat builders
 Persico Dosimo, municipality in the province of Cremona, Lombardy, Italy
 Zelo Buon Persico, municipality in the province of Lodi, Lombardy, Italy

See also 

 Persic